John Thomas Wyatt (April 19, 1934 – April 6, 1998) was an American professional baseball pitcher. He played all or part of nine seasons in Major League Baseball (MLB), primarily as a relief pitcher. From 1961 through 1969, he played for the Kansas City Athletics (1961–66), Boston Red Sox (1966–68), New York Yankees (1968), Detroit Tigers (1968) and Oakland Athletics (1969). In the Negro leagues, he played for the Indianapolis Clowns (1953–55). Wyatt batted and threw right-handed.

Wyatt saved John O'Donoghue's first big league win, coming at Dodger Stadium on May 12, 1964.

Life and career
Wyatt was born in Chicago, Illinois, a son of Claudette (née Watkins) and John Wyatt Sr. He grew up in Buffalo, New York, where he attended Fosdick-Masten Park High School.

His contract was sold to the Tigers from the Yankees on June 15, 1968.

In his major league career, Wyatt posted a 42-44 record with a 3.72 ERA and 103 saves in 435 games pitched. He was selected to the 1964 American League All-Star Team, and pitched for the Red Sox in the 1967 World Series, as the winning pitcher in Game Six.

Wyatt died from a heart attack in Omaha, Nebraska, at the age of 63.

References

External links

1934 births
1998 deaths
20th-century African-American sportspeople
African-American baseball players
Albany Senators players
American expatriate baseball players in Mexico
American League All-Stars
Baseball players from Chicago
Boston Red Sox players
Dallas Rangers players
Detroit Tigers players
El Paso Texans players
Hannibal Cardinals players
Indianapolis Clowns players
Jacksonville Braves players
Kansas City Athletics players
Major League Baseball pitchers
Mexican League baseball pitchers
New York Yankees players
Oakland Athletics players
Pocatello Bannocks players
Portsmouth-Norfolk Tides players
Sioux City Soos players
Sultanes de Monterrey players
Sportspeople from Buffalo, New York
Baseball players from New York (state)
People with type 2 diabetes
American amputees